Louis period styles is the collective name for five distinct styles of French architecture and interior design. The styles span the period from 1610 to 1793.

Styles
Each of the five styles is named for the ruler during the particular period:
 1610–1643: Louis XIII style (Louis Treize), in the early phase of French Baroque
 1643–1715: Louis XIV style (Louis Quatorze)
 1715–1723: French Regency style (Régence), during the regency of Philippe II, duc d’Orléans
 1723–1774: Louis XV style (Louis Quinze)
 1774–1793: Louis XVI style (Louis Seize)

Applications
The terms are applied as style terms for the French forms of:
architecture
interior design 
fine arts 
decorative arts 
furniture
crafts

References 

French architectural styles
Baroque architectural styles
Decorative arts
Interior design
History of furniture
Architecture in France
Ancien Régime French architecture